Parkdale Secondary College, which is located in the Melbourne suburb of Mordialloc, Victoria, Australia, is Parkdale's local public school. It is located on Warren Road opposite Don Tantell Leisure Centre.

The college has completed the first stage and the second stage of a major upgrade which includes an early learning centre.

The principal of the school (from late 2017) is David Russell.

Overview 
Parkdale Secondary College is a year 7–12 public secondary college with an enrolment of approximately 1,800 students. Parkdale is involved in the iiNet program of RATL, which allows international students to study at the school. Parkdale also has a sister school in Japan called Nishi High School.

The college's median subject study score for 2008 and 2009 was 30, with 5% of the students receiving a score of above 40. They were ranked the 222nd school in the state in 2008

In October 2014, the school celebrated its 50th anniversary.

Principals 
 John F Dower (1963–1967) founding principal
 R G Gilmour (1968–1973)
 L D Thomson (1974–1978, 1980)
 M J O'Brien (1979a, 1981–982a, 1983–1986)
 D Stewart (1987a)
 Philip Knight (1988–2006)
 Greg McMahon (2007–2014)
 Debby Chaves (2014–2017)
 David Russell (2017 – present)

History 
Parkdale High School was established in 1964. In its first year, it was located in four prefabricated classrooms within the grounds of Mordialloc Secondary College and although it shared some facilities it was run as a separate school by principal John F Dower with five teachers and 78 students. After a late start to the year 1965, the buildings on the present site were completed sufficiently for occupation by the now two school levels (then known as forms 1 and 2) and comprised approximately 200 students.

In 1989 the name of the school changed to Parkdale Secondary College.
During the time Phil Knight was principal, the school grew from approximately 400 students in 1988 to 1025 students in 2006 and under Greg McMahon it grew from 1100 to over 1789 students.

Sport
Represented by the Parky Seahorse, Parkdale competes in the Beachside District in athletics, swimming, cross-country and alternative sports.
The Mordialloc-Braeside Football Club was formed in February 1969 by three 13-year-old students of the then Parkdale High School, which included Peter Moait, John Ronke and Dean Carroll.

SSV championships 
Parkdale has won the following School Sport Victoria state championships.

Boys:

 Football (Senior) - 2014, 2016 (2)
 Football (Intermediate) - 2016
 Rugby League (Junior) - 2011

Girls:

 Football (Junior) - 2019
 Netball (Year 7) - 2014
 Soccer (Intermediate) - 2019
 Soccer (Year 8) - 2017

Mixed:

 Baseball (Intermediate) - 2018
 Baseball (Year 8) - 2013, 2017 (2)
 Baseball (Year 7) - 2012, 2016 (2)
 Basketball (Year 8) - 2008
 Cricket (Year 8) - 2004, 2005 (2)
 Football (Year 7) - 2013
 Golf (Senior) - 2014
 Hockey (Year 7) - 2018

Arts

School productions 
Andrew Mullett, a teacher at the school, has directed the annual school play since 1983; his recent additions include those below:
 2013 – Promises/Taking Stock
 2011 – A Rum Business
 2010 – Going Forward
 2009 – Shady Deals
 2008 – The Night Shift
 2007 – Lost for Words
 2006 – Perspectives

Rock Eisteddfod
Parkdale competes in the National Rock Eisteddfod biennially. Most recently, the 2009 entry, Dream Stealers, was awarded third in the grand final, and received a wildcard into the National TV Special Results. In the 2007 entry Parkdale positioned 3rd in the Premier Division and was a wildcard in the 2007 National TV Special Results. The 2005 entry positioned 4th in the Premier Division Grand Placings, and was the Victorian state winner of the National TV Special Results.

Notable alumni
 Harley Balic – former AFL player for the Fremantle Football Club and the Melbourne Football Club
 Michael Clarke - Melbourne Cup winning jockey
 Heath Davidson – Paralympian
 Tom Lamb – former AFL player for the West Coast Football Club
 Nicole Livingstone – Olympian
 Peter Slade – former VFL/AFL player for the Melbourne Football Club
 Peter Williamson – former VFL/AFL player for the Melbourne Football Club
 Jesse Wyatt – Paralympian

See also 
 List of high schools in Victoria

References 

Public high schools in Melbourne
Educational institutions established in 1964
1964 establishments in Australia
Buildings and structures in the City of Kingston (Victoria)